Thomas Edward Burns (born 1927), known as Edward Burns, is a former unionist politician in Northern Ireland.

Born in Lurgan, Burns studied at Renshaw's College in Belfast.  He moved to Canada, where he worked in a bank, then to South Africa, where he was employed in construction.  He later lived near Donaghadee and worked as the director of various property management companies.

He was elected to the executive of the United Ulster Loyalist Council and became active in the Democratic Unionist Party.  At the 1973 Northern Ireland Assembly election, he was elected in Belfast South, and he narrowly held the seat on the Northern Ireland Constitutional Convention, in 1975.

In his spare time, Burns was an enthusiastic yachtsman and was a member of the World Christian Endeavour Choir.

References

1927 births
Possibly living people
Democratic Unionist Party politicians
Members of the Northern Ireland Assembly 1973–1974
Members of the Northern Ireland Constitutional Convention
People from Lurgan
Politicians from County Armagh